Christine Doan (born 21 July 1949 in Midland, Michigan) is a former Australian equestrian, sustainability advocate and technology entrepreneur.

Doan competed at the Barcelona 1992 Olympics in the individual dressage event. Riding Dondolo, Doan finished in 28th place in the individual event.

As of 2020, Doan owns "Malanda North", a property in the Atherton Tablelands, where she promotes sustainable design of technology and the environment.

References

External links 

 Official website

Living people
1949 births
Australian female equestrians
Australian dressage riders
Equestrians at the 1992 Summer Olympics
Olympic equestrians of Australia